Symeon Papadopoulos (born 18 April 2000) is a Greek professional footballer who plays as a goalkeeper for Super League club Volos.

Personal
His father Giorgos Papadopoulos, is a former professional footballer who played mainly for Iraklis.

References

2000 births
Living people
Greek footballers
Super League Greece players
PAOK FC players
Volos N.F.C. players
Association football goalkeepers
Footballers from Thessaloniki